Themis was a steam cargo ship built in 1911 by the William Doxford & Sons of Pallion for the Wabanas Dampskibskompani, a subsidiary of Nova Scotia Steel & Coal Company and managed by Wilhelm Wilhelmsen. She was named after Themis, Titaness of divine law and order.

Design and Construction
On March 10, 1911 it was reported that a new company "The Wabana Steamship Company" (Wabanas Dampskibskompani) with a capital of NOK 1,500,000 was registered in Nøtterøy with the purpose of transporting ore between Newfoundland and Europe. The new company was a subsidiary of the Nova Scotia Steel Company and was managed by Wilhelm Wilhelmsen. Two ships were leased to conduct the operations (SS Tellus and SS Themis) by the newly formed company for a period of 10 years.

The ship was laid down in 1910 at William Doxford & Sons shipyard in Pallion. After completion of her sea trials, the ship was delivered to her owner on the same day.

Themis was assessed at 7,402 GRT,  and 12,925 DWT which made her the largest ship in Scandinavia at the time, slightly larger than her sister ship Tellus.

Operational history
On March 21, 1910 Themis was chartered to Nova Scotia Steel & Coal Company for a period of 9 consecutive navigation seasons (April through December) for a fee of £2,031.5 per calendar month starting in 1911. On March 24, 1910 Themis was also chartered to Gans Steamship Company for nine consecutive winter seasons for a fee £1,562.10 per calendar month, starting in 1911 as well.

After completion Themis proceeded directly to North America and arrived at Wabana on May 11, 1911. During her maiden trip in May 1911 the ship brought 12,500 tons of ore from Wabana to Philadelphia. Themis continued operating on Wabana-Philadelphia route for the remainder of 1911. For example, in August 1911 she managed to make three trips from Wabana, bringing a total of 37,560 tons of iron ore to Port Richmond.

After the close of navigation Themis was chartered by The Spanish-American Iron Company, a subsidiary of Pennsylvania Steel Company, to transport iron ore from Felton in Cuba to Philadelphia and Baltimore throughout December 1911 and early spring of 1912.  The ship departed for her first trip on November 26, 1911 and finished her charter on April 24, 1912. During this service the ship brought in over 100,000 tons of ore in 10 trips. For example, on December 19, 1911 the ship unloaded 11,000 tons of ore at Sparrow's Point in record time. In a similar fashion the ship brought and unloaded 10,900 tons of Cuban ore at Sparrow's Point on April 12, 1912. On April 25, 1912 the ship sailed for Wabana to resume her summertime ore carrying to Philadelphia which continued until the end of navigation season in early November.

On November 7, 1912 Themis departed Philadelphia for Tampa arriving there on November 13. There she loaded 3,073 tons of phosphates for transportation to Antwerp before continuing to New Orleans. After loading cargo, the vessel left New Orleans on November 26, but ran aground next day damaging her forpeak. Nevertheless, Themis pressed on with her journey and arrived in Antwerp on December 20 with a leaking forpeak and some damage about her deck caused by storms she encountered during her trip. The ship left Antwerp on January 5, 1913 to Savannah via Cardiff arriving there on February 7. 16,000 bales of cotton were loaded onto the ship in Savannah and she sailed out on February 14 for Bremen. After unloading, the ship then proceeded back to Wabana via Newcastle to resume ore transportation to Philadelphia until October 1913. On October 10, 1913 Themis left Wabana for Rotterdam and continued serving this route for the remainder of 1913.

On January 10, 1914 Themis departed New York City for Marseille, arriving there on January 30. After her return to the US, the ship loaded 1,652 tons of phosphate pebble at Tampa on March 10 and 5,500 tons more at Boca Grande on March 14, then proceeding to Galveston and Savannah, where 13,450 bales of cotton were loaded on March 24.  Themis departed from Pensacola to Bremen on March 25, and arrived in Germany on April 16. After unloading at Bremen, the vessel sailed on to Wabana and resumed her ore shipments to Rotterdam through mid-August 1914. After arrival in Wabana on August 27, the vessel loaded ore and proceeded to Philadelphia arriving there on September 3, and from there continuing to Norfolk in ballast.

After the start of World War I Themis could no longer be involved in her transatlantic ore trade, as the main consumer of her cargo was Germany. She became a tramp ship and was chartered for any cargo that she could carry. She was chartered to carry coal and departed Norfolk on September 10 to Piraeus, arriving there on October 1. The ship then was chartered for one more trip, leaving New York on December 26, 1914 and arriving in Copenhagen on January 18, 1915. On March 31, 1915 Themis together with several other  Wilhelm Wilhelmsen's ships was sub-chartered by Nova Scotia Steel & Coal Company to Barber Line for a period of 8 months for a fee of £7,680 per calendar month. The vessel was handed over to Barber Line on April 28, 1915, and departed shortly thereafter for South America, visiting ports of Buenos Aires and Montevideo, returning to Boston on August 12, 1915.

On September 12, 1915 Themis departed New York for Wellington, Sydney, Melbourne and other Australian ports carrying 11,000 tons of cargo, the majority of which was case oil (including 24,000 cases for New Zealand) consigned for the Vacuum Oil Company. The ship reached the Panama Canal on September 21, by which time the slides occurred on the canal and delayed her until October 4, at which point the Canal was closed indefinitely. Themis was ordered to proceed to Australia via the Cape route, arriving at Durban on November 8. After re-coaling, the ship continued on to her destination reaching Wellington on December 13. Themis then proceeded to Australia and visited several ports until her departure on February 23, 1916 from Newcastle for South America. The vessel arrived at Montevideo on April 3, continued on to Buenos Aires two days later where she loaded among other things 8,341 bags of dried blood for New York. The ship arrived in New York on May 5, 1916 and after unloading was immediately chartered for cargo delivery to China. About 10,500 tons of cargo was loaded onto the vessel, including 200,000 cases of oil and 500 bales of cotton. The ship left New York on June 21, passed through the Panama Canal on July 2, arriving at Hankow on August 25, 1916. From there the ship continued on to Shanghai, and then to Philippines where she loaded 11,250 tons of sugar for delivery to New York.

On November 21, 1916 Themis on a passage from Iloilo for New York City grounded on the outer end of the West Breakwater in Limon Bay right after leaving the Panama Canal for sea. The ship laid with her bow aground until the afternoon of November 25 while the divers patched the holes in her hull and bulkheads. She was then pulled off and towed stern first into port of Cristóbal to discharge the remaining cargo, before being put into drydock at Balboa for repairs on December 10. About 2,000 tons of sugar were lost in the accident. The repair work was finalized on December 22 and the vessel proceeded through the Canal on December 24 to reload her cargo. Themis finally departed the Canal area on January 1, 1917 after reloading was completed.

On February 14, 1917 Themis left Baltimore with a load of acid phosphate bound for Rotterdam. From there the ship sailed to India where she loaded wheat cargo for transportation to Marseilles.

Sinking
Themis sailed from Karachi early in the morning on September 7, 1917 carrying 11,000 tons of wheat, 260 tons of St John's bread and some other general cargo for Marseilles via the Suez Canal. The ship was under command of Captain Erling Jacobsen and had a crew of 36 men. Approximately at 01:00 of October 11, 1917, the vessel departed Malta escorted out of harbor by 4 British patrol boats. The ship started listing on her starboard side almost immediately and Captain Jacobsen ordered the crew to stop the engines and abandon ship. The lifeboats were lowered, and the crew left the ship in an orderly fashion. Shortly, two British escort vessels appeared, HMT Portsmouth among them, and started assisting the crew. All 37 men boarded Portsmouth who took them to Bizerta where they arrived around 22:30 on the same day. The crew later was transferred to French warship Saint Louis where they were provided with temporary accommodations. Themis sank stern first around 12:15 in an approximate position . It was later discovered that the torpedo was launched by German submarine .

Notes 

1911 ships
Merchant ships of Norway
Steamships of Norway
World War I merchant ships of Norway
Maritime incidents in 1917
Ships sunk by German submarines in World War I
World War I shipwrecks in the Mediterranean Sea
Ships built on the River Wear